The Newport Miner is a weekly newspaper published Wednesdays in Newport, Washington, United States. It covers Newport and the surrounding communities of the Pend Oreille River valley and Pend Oreille County in the U.S. state of Washington and Bonner County in the state of Idaho. According to unclear records, the Newport Pilot was founded in 1897, followed by the Miner in 1899, and the two merged shortly after. , it was owned by the Willenbrock family and printed by Free Press Publishing. In the early 20th century, it had an outsized influence, and publisher Fred L. Wolf, who ran the paper for 38 years, was elected to the Washington State Legislature with a strong majority in 1918. Its circulation is about 6,000.

References

External links 
 Official website
 Chronicling America entry
 Centennial edition

Newspapers published in Washington (state)
Pend Oreille County, Washington